The following is a list of radio stations in the Canadian province of Nova Scotia, .

See also 
 Lists of radio stations in North and Central America

External links
Canadian Communications Foundation - History of radio stations in Nova Scotia

Nova Scotia
Radio stations